Devil's Feud Cake is a 1963 Warner Bros. Merrie Melodies animated short directed by Friz Freleng. The short was released on February 9, 1963, and stars Bugs Bunny and Yosemite Sam.

Plot
Yosemite Sam robs the Last National Bank and makes his getaway in an airplane driven by Bugs Bunny. Sam falls out of the plane and dies. Sam ends up in Hell, where he makes a deal with the Devil. If Sam brings Bugs to Hell, he will be set free, but if he fails, he will remain in Hell forever. Sam gladly accepts the deal and the Head Devil sends him back to the world of the living. After three failed attempts on Bugs' life, Sam tells the Devil that if he wants Bugs, he can get him himself and announces that he is staying in Hell.

See also
 List of Yosemite Sam cartoons
 List of Bugs Bunny cartoons

References

External links

1963 films
1963 animated films
1963 short films
Merrie Melodies short films
Compilation films
Short films directed by Friz Freleng
The Devil in film
Films set in hell
Films scored by William Lava
Bugs Bunny films
1960s Warner Bros. animated short films
Yosemite Sam films